A. proteus may refer to:
 Acmaeops proteus, a long-horned beetle species found in Canada, Mexico and the United States
 Amoeba proteus, a protozoan species

See also 
 Proteus (disambiguation)